Hibiscus Season is a Canadian animated short film, directed by Éléonore Goldberg and released in 2020. Based on Goldberg's own childhood, the film centres on Rachel, a young girl from France living in Zaire with her family in the early 1990s, who is taking refuge with her mother in the French embassy in Kinshasa during the military riots.

The film won the Prix Iris for Best Animated Short Film at the 23rd Quebec Cinema Awards.

References

2020 films
2020 animated films
Canadian animated short films
Quebec films
Films set in the Democratic Republic of the Congo
2020 short films
2020s animated short films
2020s French-language films
French-language Canadian films
2020s Canadian films
Best Animated Short Film Jutra and Iris Award winners